The following is a chronological list of Minnesota State Bar Association Presidents, beginning in 1901 when the organization was reconstituted.

References

Minnesota State Bar Association